The Ruins of Chicago is a 1983 role-playing game adventure published by Timeline for The Morrow Project.

Plot summary
The Ruins of Chicago is adventure set in Chicago 150 years after World War III, in which Morrow Recon Team G-12C are awakened from a long sleep for a mission.

Reception
Chris Baylis reviewed R-004 The Ruins of Chicago for Imagine magazine, and stated that "As the first 'city' module, R-004 gives players the chance to learn urban and guerilla warfare, but the emphasis is on the negotiations and interaction with the various city factions. The scenario gives good ground for an experienced team of proven ability, but will be a very hard task for novices."

William A. Barton reviewed The Ruins of Chicago in The Space Gamer No. 72. Barton commented that "for a team of veteran TMP players, The Ruins of Chicago can prove a most challenging and worthwhile roleplaying experience."

Reviews
Different Worlds #34 (May/June, 1984)
Different Worlds #46

References

Role-playing game supplements introduced in 1983
The Morrow Project adventures